Alucita molliflua is a species of moth of the family Alucitidae. It is known from Uganda.

References

Endemic fauna of Uganda
Alucitidae
Insects of Uganda
Moths of Africa
Moths described in 1927
Taxa named by Edward Meyrick